Jan Košťál (born April 13, 1980 in Karlovy Vary) is a Czech professional ice hockey player. He played with HC Karlovy Vary in the Czech Extraliga during the 2010–11 Czech Extraliga season. In 2013, he signed for English Premier League side Swindon Wildcats.

References

External links 
 
 

1980 births
Czech ice hockey right wingers
HC Karlovy Vary players
Living people
Sportspeople from Karlovy Vary
Swindon Wildcats players
Czech expatriate ice hockey people
Czech expatriate sportspeople in England
Expatriate ice hockey players in England